Rhon may refer to:

 Rhon psion in the fictional Saga of the Skolian Empire
 Rhön Mountains, Germany